Sokoły may refer to the following places:
Sokoły, Grajewo County in Podlaskie Voivodeship (north-east Poland)
Sokoły, Kolno County in Podlaskie Voivodeship (north-east Poland)
Sokoły, Wysokie Mazowieckie County in Podlaskie Voivodeship (north-east Poland)
Sokoły, Masovian Voivodeship (east-central Poland)
Sokoły, Gołdap County in Warmian-Masurian Voivodeship (north Poland)
Sokoły, Pisz County in Warmian-Masurian Voivodeship (north Poland)